Evansville Township is a township in Douglas County, Minnesota, United States. The population was 244 as of the 2000 census.

Evansville Township was organized in 1868, and named for a mail carrier named Evans who was killed by Indians.

Geography

Demographics
As of the census of 2000, there were 244 people, 83 households, and 70 families residing in the township.  The population density was 7.5 people per square mile (2.9/km2).  There were 96 housing units at an average density of 2.9/sq mi (1.1/km2).  The racial makeup of the township was 99.59% White, and 0.41% from two or more races.

There were 83 households, out of which 42.2% had children under the age of 18 living with them, 80.7% were married couples living together, 1.2% had a female householder with no husband present, and 14.5% were non-families. 14.5% of all households were made up of individuals, and 3.6% had someone living alone who was 65 years of age or older.  The average household size was 2.94 and the average family size was 3.24.

In the township the population was spread out, with 32.0% under the age of 18, 6.6% from 18 to 24, 22.5% from 25 to 44, 29.5% from 45 to 64, and 9.4% who were 65 years of age or older.  The median age was 37 years. For every 100 females, there were 112.2 males.  For every 100 females age 18 and over, there were 112.8 males.

The median income for a household in the township was $48,750, and the median income for a family was $48,750. Males had a median income of $28,000 versus $26,250 for females. The per capita income for the township was $17,601.  About 14.1% of families and 14.3% of the population were below the poverty line, including 19.7% of those under the age of eighteen and 47.4% of those 65 or over.

References

Townships in Douglas County, Minnesota
Townships in Minnesota